Vesyolye Ulybki (Cyrillic: Весёлые Улыбки; translation: Happy Smiles) is t.A.T.u.'s third and final Russian studio album, released on 21 October 2008. The album's working title was Upravleniye Otbrosami (Cyrillic: Управление Отбросами; translation: Waste Management). The album reached sales of more than 250,000 copies in Russia. The English counterpart, Waste Management, was released in December 2009.

The album has been made available to music streaming platforms in 2020.

Singles
 The first single from the album, "Белый плащик", was released in November 2007. The music video was released on 29 November 2007.  The single was released as a maxi-single with the song, remixes and the second single, "220". It also had mobile wallpapers, a poster and a coupon for a discount of 50 roubles for the supposed album Upravleniye Otbrosami, which expired in June 2008, but they were still valid for the discount of the album of Весёлые Улыбки 
 The second single, "220", was released in April 2008. The song was included in the "Beliy Plaschik" maxi-single and featured 3 mobile wallpapers. A music video was released in June 2008 that featured the group in 'burlesque'-styled costumes dancing and singing to the song.
 The third single, "You and I", was released exclusively to Love Radio in Russia for three days on 12 September 2008 and then on Europa Plus Radio in Ukraine on 16 September.
The fourth single, "Снегопады", was released in April 2009. A trailer for the music video and a premiere date of 17 April were posted on 9 April. After the video premiered, two different versions were posted on t.A.T.u.'s official YouTube: the TV version and the special "Heart Attack Edition", which is the video without the song playing.

Track listing

Release history

Notes
 "Intro" is an instrumental version of "Не жалей".
 "Весёлые улыбки" is the same instrumental track as "Waste Management" on the Waste Management album.
 Lena has recorded a Spanish version of "Running Blind" and released it on her Spanish EP

References

External links
 t.A.T.u.'s interview. Time Out Moscow. 1 September 2008

2008 albums
T.A.T.u. albums
Albums produced by Billy Steinberg